The Europe/Africa Zone was one of the three zones of the regional Davis Cup competition in 1997.

In the Europe/Africa Zone there were four different tiers, called groups, in which teams competed against each other to advance to the upper tier. Winners in Group I advanced to the World Group Qualifying Round, along with losing teams from the World Group first round. Teams who lost in the first round competed in the relegation play-offs, with winning teams remaining in Group I, whereas teams who lost their play-offs were relegated to the Europe/Africa Zone Group II in 1998.

Participating nations

Draw

 and  relegated to Group II in 1998.

First round

Denmark vs. Hungary

Zimbabwe vs. Ukraine

Croatia vs. Morocco

Second round

Belgium vs. Denmark

Great Britain vs. Zimbabwe

Slovakia vs. Israel

Austria vs. Croatia

First round relegation play-offs

Ukraine vs. Great Britain

Second round relegation play-offs

Hungary vs. Ukraine

References

External links
Davis Cup official website

Davis Cup Europe/Africa Zone
Europe Africa Zone Group I